Acetobacteroides hydrogenigenes  is a Gram-negative, carbohydrate-fermenting, mesophilic, strictly anaerobic, non-spore-forming and non-motile bacterium from the genus of Acetobacteroides which has been isolated from reedswamp in Qingdao  in China. Acetobacteroides hydrogenigenes produces hydrogen.

References

External links 

Type strain of Acetobacteroides hydrogenigenes at BacDive -  the Bacterial Diversity Metadatabase

Bacteroidia
Bacteria described in 2014